Blair Executive Airport , formerly the Blair Municipal Airport, is about  south of Blair, Nebraska, a city in Washington County, Nebraska.

History
In 1996 the city of Blair purchased the privately owned Eagle Airfield  which became the site of the present Blair Municipal Airport. Eagle Airfield was renamed, and extensive construction replaced the original narrow runway, removed a grass cross-runway, and added new tarmacs and hangars. The original airport location was demolished and turned into a golf course by 1999.

The Omaha Police Department's Air Support Unit began operating out of the airport in June 2019, moving from the North Omaha Airport.

The airport's official description was changed from 'municipal' to 'executive' by the Blair Airport Authority in 2022 for marketing purposes.

Facilities
The airport had an average of 42 operations per day in the year ending May 2018. 64 aircraft were then based at this airport.

Accidents and incidents
On August 16, 2019, a Bell 206 B III, operated by the Omaha Police Department, lost power about 40 to 50 feet in the air and made a hard landing.  The two pilots suffered minor injuries, but the aircraft was a loss.
On May 13, 2017, a glider operated by a club crashed when the canopy came loose during takeoff, causing the pilot to lose control and the glider to crash.  There was one fatality.

References

External links
 Blair Municipal Airport
 City of Blair Website 
 AirNav Profile

Airports in Nebraska